STAB or stab may refer to:

Stabbing, penetration or contact with a sharp object
Stab, Kentucky, US
Stab (b-boy move), a breakdance technique
Stab (music), an element in musical composition
Stab (Luftwaffe designation), during World War II, a German designation for command aircraft or headquarters units
Johann Stab, Johannes Stabius (1450–1522), Austrian cartographer
Stab, the film-within-a-film from the Scream franchise
"Stab", a song by Built to Spill from There's Nothing Wrong with Love

Acronyms and abbreviations
Sodium triacetoxyborohydride, a reducing agent used in organic synthesis
St. Anne's-Belfield School, a college preparatory school in Charlottesville, Virginia, US
Same-type attack bonus, a scoring element in the gameplay of Pokémon video games
Symbol table, a data structure used by a language translator
Stab jacket or buoyancy compensator, a piece of diving equipment
Stabilizer (aircraft)
Strike Assault Boat

See also
 stabs, a debugging data format